Nova Scotia is a parliamentary democracy. Its legislature consists of the Lieutenant Governor of Nova Scotia and fifty-five members representing their electoral districts in the Nova Scotia House of Assembly. As Canada's head of state, Charles III is the head of Nova Scotia's chief executive government.  His duties in Nova Scotia are carried out by the Lieutenant-Governor, Arthur LeBlanc. The government is headed by the Premier, Tim Houston, who took office August 31, 2021. Halifax is home to the House of Assembly and Lieutenant-Governor. The House of Assembly has met in Halifax at Province House since 1819.

History
The first general assembly in Nova Scotia sat in May, 1758, making it the oldest in Canada.

Of the registered voters in 2017, 53.4% voted. Voter turnout has decreased from 82% turnout in 1960.

From Confederation to World War I

From 1920 to 1967

From 1970 to present

Nova Scotia elected minority governments in the  2006, 2003, and 1998. The Progressive Conservative government of John Hamm, and later Rodney MacDonald, required the support of the New Democratic Party or Liberal Party after the election in 2003.

The Liberal party won both the October 8th, 2013 and most recent provincial election on May 30, 2017, each with a majority government. Prior to that, the election on June 9, 2009 was won by the NDP party for the first time ever. They captured a majority with 31 seats to 11 for the Liberals and 10 for the PC Party. The election on June 13, 2006 elected 23 Progressive Conservatives, 20 New Democrats and 9 Liberals, leaving Nova Scotia with a Progressive Conservative minority government.

In 2006/07, the Province passed a budget of $6.9 billion, with a projected $72 million surplus. Federal equalization payments account for $1.385 billion, or 20.07% of the provincial revenue.  While Nova Scotians have enjoyed balanced budgets for several years, the accumulated debt exceeds $12 billion (including forecasts of future liability, such as pensions and environmental cleanups), resulting in slightly over $897 million in debt servicing payments, or 12.67% of expenses.

Current politics
On May 30, 2017, the Liberal Party won its second consecutive majority government.

In the 2018/19 budget, results were $10.78 billion in expenses, $10.81 billion in revenue, and a projected surplus of $29.4 million. The surplus is largely related to expected tax income from the future sale of cannabis within the province. The province's revenue comes mainly from the taxation of personal and corporate income, although taxes on tobacco and alcohol, its stake in the Atlantic Lottery Corporation, and oil and gas royalties are also significant. The province participates in the HST, a blended sales tax collected by the federal government using the GST tax system.

In the 2021 Nova Scotia general election, the Progressive Conservatives won a majority government.

See also

 Province House (Nova Scotia)
 Nova Scotia House of Assembly
 List of Nova Scotia general elections
 List of Nova Scotia Premiers
 Monarchy in Nova Scotia
 Politics of Canada
 Political culture of Canada
 Council of the Federation

References

External links
Government of Nova Scotia
How The East Was Won: Nova Scotia Elections (1949-2003)